The 1805 Molise earthquake occurred on July 26 at 21:01 UTC. It has an estimated magnitude of 6.6 on the equivalent magnitude scale (Me) (calculated from seismic intensity data) and a maximum perceived intensity of X on the Mercalli intensity scale. The area of greatest damage was between the towns of Isernia and Campobasso, while the area of intense damage extended over about 2,000 square kilometres. There were an estimated 5,573 deaths resulting from this earthquake and two of the aftershocks.

Tectonic setting
The Southern Apennines originated as northeast moving fold and thrust belt. Since the Middle Pleistocene, the tectonics has been dominated by extension. The axial part of the Apennines is the most seismically active, with a series of damaging historical earthquakes up to about 7 in magnitude. The major normal fault in the epicentral area of the 1805 event is the Bojano fault system.

Earthquake
The earthquake was a result of movement on the NW–SE trending Bojano fault system. A surface rupture of 40 km has been attributed to this event, with a maximum displacement of 150 cm. The mainshock was preceded by a series of low intensity foreshocks throughout the previous day. The aftershock sequence continued until the following June.

Damage

The damage was particularly intense in the foothills of the Matese massif and the Bojano plain, with 30 towns and villages being severely affected. Damage was recorded as far away as Naples and Salerno. Landslides and other slope failures were seen over an area of about 5,300 square kilometres.

The official number of recorded deaths is given as 5,573, representing nearly 3% of the area's inhabitants, with a further 1,583 injured. Other estimates of the death toll are in the range 4,000 to 6,000.

Aftermath

Response
The most affected area lay within the then Kingdom of Naples. The king, Ferdinand IV, took control of the response to this disaster. He sent Gabriele Giannocoli, a tax lawyer, to visit those areas of the countryside that has suffered the most, to evaluate the situation and to do what needed to be done. He was given considerable powers, together with the financial means, to allow him to carry out his task. He concentrated on visiting the most damaged areas, relying on reports from other officials in less affected parts. At his request, soldiers were sent to restore order and to prevent looting in some areas. Only properties in a dangerous state were repaired or demolished. Temporary shelters were provided for the homeless and huts for use as hospitals. Taxes were suspended by the king for all of the countryside around Molise in August.

See also
 List of earthquakes in Italy
 List of historical earthquakes

References

Earthquakes in Italy
1805 earthquakes
1805 in Italy
July 1805 events
1805 disasters in Italy
1805 disasters in Europe